Larry Cochell is a former American professional coach in NCAA Division I college baseball. He coached baseball for the Emporia State Hornets (then known as Kansas State Teachers College), the Creighton Bluejays, the Cal State Los Angeles Golden Eagles, the Oral Roberts Golden Eagles, the Northwestern Wildcats, the Cal State Fullerton Titans, and the Oklahoma Sooners.

Career
He took three programs to the College World Series, doing so with Oral Roberts in 1978, Cal State Fullerton 1988 & 1990, and Oklahoma in 1992, 1994 & 1995, being the first coach to do so (with Ron Polk and Andy Lopez doing the feat in later years). He went 8–10 in six appearances. It was with Oklahoma that he received his highest success, leading them to a national championship at the 1994 College World Series in his fifteen seasons with the club. During his time at Oklahoma, he had his two of his sons play on the team, Chad (1997–2000) and Craig (1992–1993), with the former playing 126 total games and hitting .255 for his career. He is one of 56 coaches with over 1,100 wins, having a record of 1331–813–3, 21st most.

Controversy and aftermath
On April 29, 2005, reports surfaced that he used racial remarks to describe one of his players, notably saying in an interview before an ESPN2 telecast of the Oklahoma-Wichita State game that “There are honkies and white people and there are niggers and black people. Dunigan is a good black kid ... There’s no nigger in him.”, which he used to describe Oklahoma's freshman outfielder Joe Dunigan III. On May 1, 2005, he resigned, with Sunny Golloway serving as interim head coach for the rest of the season. After the resignation, he was offered positions in minor league baseball and work in Europe, but he turned them down, citing how he wanted to spend time with his family and deal with his health, particularly blockage in two of his arteries that were found around the time of his stepping down.

Head coaching record

References

Notes

See also
List of college baseball coaches with 1,100 wins

External links
Racial remarks

Living people
Emporia State Hornets baseball coaches
Cal State Fullerton Titans baseball coaches
Creighton Bluejays baseball coaches
Northwestern Wildcats baseball coaches
Oklahoma Sooners baseball coaches
Oral Roberts Golden Eagles baseball coaches
Year of birth missing (living people)
Cal State Los Angeles Golden Eagles baseball coaches